Abacetus amplicollis is a species of ground beetle in the subfamily Pterostichinae. It was described by Henry Walter Bates in 1890 and is found in India and Myanmar.

References

amplicollis
Beetles described in 1890
Insects of India
Insects of Southeast Asia